Ben Pitman House is a registered historic building in Cincinnati, Ohio, listed in the National Register on July 7, 1969.
  
Benjamin Pitman lived in this house until his death in 1910.

Notes

External links
Photographs from the University of Cincinnati

National Register of Historic Places in Cincinnati
Houses in Cincinnati
Houses on the National Register of Historic Places in Ohio
Cincinnati Local Historic Landmarks